Herold is a surname. Notable people with the surname include:

 August Herold (1902–1973), German grape breeder
 Carl Herold (1848–1931), German politician
 Charles Hérold Jr. (born 1990), Haitian footballer
 Constantin Herold (1912–1984), Romanian multi-sport athlete
 David Herold (1842–1865), American conspirator in the Lincoln assassination
 Deborah Herold (born 1995), Indian cyclist
 Don Herold (1889–1966), American humorist
 Else Herold (1906–1999), German pianist
 Felicia Herold (1915–2003), English actress
 Ferdinand Hérold (1791–1833), French composer
 Georg Herold (born 1947), German artist
 Gérard Hérold (1939–1993), French actor
 Horst Herold (1923–2018), German police officer
 J. Christopher Herold (1919–1964), Czech-American editor and author
 Jacques Hérold (1910–1987), Romanian painter
 Jens-Peter Herold (born 1965), German middle-distance runner
 Johann Gregor Herold (1696–1775), German painter
 Justin Herold (born 1991), American basketball player
 Kim Herold (born 1979), Finnish model and singer-songwriter
 Maxime Hérold (born 1989), French rugby league footballer
 Robert Herold (1910–1969), French gymnast
 Rudolph A. Herold (1870–1926), American architect
 Sabine Herold (born 1981), French libertarian
 Ted Herold (1942–2021), German Schlager singer
 Vilhelm Herold (1865–1937), Danish operatic tenor
 Volker Herold (born 1959), German actor
 Walter Herold (1897–1944), German Wehrmacht officer
 Willi Herold (1925–1946), German war criminal
 Wolfgang Herold (born 1961), German film producer